The Michigan Educational Assessment Program (MEAP) was a standardized test. The test was taken by all public school students in the U.S. state of Michigan from elementary school to middle/junior high school from the 1969-70 school year to the 2013-14 school year. For high school students the MEAP test was replaced in the 2006-07 school year by the Michigan Merit Exam., .

The test was replaced in the 2014-15 school year by the Michigan Student Test of Educational Progress, or M-STEP.

The tests have high content validity with respect to the subject
specific curriculum for the particular grade level in the State of Michigan. The
participation at MEAP testing sessions is mandatory for all public school students. (Journal of Vocational Behavior 60, 178–198 (2002)

History
The program was started by the State Board of Education and supported by then Governor William G. Millken. The MEAP tests were first administered during the 1969-70 school year for the purpose of determining at various points in a student's career, their progress compared to standards set by the State Board of Education. As of Spring 2015 the MEAP has been replaced with the M-STEP (Michigan Student Test of Educational Progress).

Criticism

Many of the criticisms of the test are common to all standardized tests. Opponents feel that standardized tests cannot correctly measure student knowledge, performance, or learning. Others feel that Michigan should not waste so much money on developing their own test and instead should use national tests, that would conform better to the standards of the rest of the country.

A newspaper in 2007 had an article with the topics of a MEAP test, not yet completed by students in many districts, requiring the students to retake the exam.

References

1. Michigan department of education. Michigan Educational Assessment Program. Retrieved April 26, 2005
2. The State of Michigan. Michigan Merit Award. Retrieved June 22, 2005
  The State of Michigan. Michigan Merit Exam. Retrieved April 26, 2005
4. Michigan Department of Education. Design and Validity of the MEAP Test. Retrieved April 26, 2005
 The Office of the Governor, Jennifer Granholm. (2005) Governor Granholm Signs Legislation to Better Prepare High School Students for Success
6. The Detroit News,

External links 

Michigan Department of Education
Michigan Educational Assessment Program from the Michigan Department of Education website
Michigan Merit Award from the Michigan government Financial Aid website

Education in Michigan
Standardized tests in the United States